Southern Football Club is a football club from Kingston, Tasmania, Australia. They compete in the Southern Championship of the Football Federation Tasmania. The club was formed in 2009 by the merger of two existing clubs, Kingston Cannons and Christian United.

History

Rapid FC
Rapid FC was founded in 1958. Rapid was highly successful during its life winning the State Championship 4 times, and the Southern Premiership 5 times. For a brief period in the 1980s, due to sponsorship reasons, they were known as Rapid-Wrest Point, before switching back. They played their final match in 1996, being relegated in the process to the Southern League 2.

The name was changed and the club reformed as Kingston Cannons. They immediately won the Southern League 2 and were promoted back to the League 1.

Merger
At the end of the 2009 season, Kingston Cannons merged with Christian United to form Southern FC. In 2013 they won the Southern League 1 title and were runners up in 2014 gaining promotion into the Southern Championship.

Honours
Honours as Southern FC:
Southern League 1 Runners-up 2014
Southern League 1 Premiers 2013

Honours as Rapid:
State Championship (×4): 1976, 1979, 1980, 1982
Southern Premierships (×5): 1958, 1961, 1964, 1976, 1982
Southern Premier Runners-up (×5): 1959, 1962, 1974, 1983, 1984
KO Cup Winners (×4): 1974, 1979, 1980, 1984
Summer Cup Runners-up: 1984
Falkinder Cup Runners-up: 1958
Association Cup Winners (×2): 1961, 1965
Ascot Gold Cup Winners: 1961
DJ Trophy Winners: 1977
Cadbury Trophy Winners (×2): 1982, 1983
Cadbury Trophy Runners-up (×3): 1979, 1980, 1984

References

Association football clubs established in 1922
Soccer clubs in Tasmania
Defunct soccer clubs in Australia